Tom D. Reynolds is a retired American soccer goalkeeper who played two seasons in the North American Soccer League, one in the Major Indoor Soccer League and at least four in the American Soccer League.

In 1977, Reynolds signed with the Dallas Tornado of the North American Soccer League.  He played five games that season, but none in 1978. Moving to the Los Angeles Aztecs for the 1978-1979 NASL Indoor season, he was released without having played any games. He then signed with the California Sunshine of the American Soccer League. He led the league with a 0.79 goals against average. He spent the 1980 season with the Sacramento Gold, ranking only behind Scott Manning in GAA.  Reynolds spent 1980 & 1981 with the Major Indoor Soccer League as a Keeper for the San Francisco Fog.  He then moved to the Pennsylvania Stoners for the 1981 ASL season.  That year, he again led the ASL in goalkeeping with a 0.89 GAA.  He played for the Stoners through at least 1982.

Awards
ASL All-Star Team Selection: 1979
ASL Leading Goalkeeper: 1979, 1981

References

External links
NASL stats
MISL stats

1955 births
Living people
American soccer players
Association football goalkeepers
American Soccer League (1933–1983) players
California Sunshine players
Dallas Tornado players
Los Angeles Aztecs players
Major Indoor Soccer League (1978–1992) players
North American Soccer League (1968–1984) indoor players
North American Soccer League (1968–1984) players
Pennsylvania Stoners players
Sacramento Gold (1976–1980) players
San Francisco Fog (MISL) players